AASC may refer to:

 Australian Army Service Corps
 American Association of State Climatologists
 Avon and Somerset Constabulary, the territorial police force covering Avon and Somerset, England